The Daniel Alcides Carrión Province is the smallest of three provinces that make up the Pasco Region in Peru. It was named after the medical student Daniel Alcides Carrión. The capital of this province is Yanahuanca.

Boundaries
North: Huánuco Region
East: Pasco Province
South: Pasco Province
West: Lima Region

Geography 
The Rawra mountain range and the Rumi Cruz mountain range traverse the province. Other mountains are listed below:

Districts
The province is divided into eight districts, which are:
Yanahuanca
Chacayán
Goyllarisquizga
Paucar
San Pedro de Pillao
Santa Ana de Tusi
Tapuc
Vilcabamba

See also
 Allqaqucha
 Daniel Alcides Carrión
 Kuntuyuq
 Pukamayu
 Warawtampu
 Yana Uqhu
 Yuraq Mach'ay

References

External links
  Municipal website

Provinces of the Pasco Region